Grandy may refer to:

Grandy (surname)
Grandy's, a restaurant chain based in Nashville, Tennessee
Grandy, Minnesota
Grandy, North Carolina
Grandy, Virginia
 Grandy (ship, 1943), see Boats of the Mackenzie River watershed